Maxacteon  cratericulatus is a species of small sea snail, a predatory marine gastropod mollusc in the family Acteonidae, the barrel bubble snails.

References

 OBIS : Maxacteon  cratericulatus
 Powell A W B, William Collins Publishers Ltd, Auckland 1979 
 Photo
  Spencer H.G., Willan R.C., Marshall B.A. & Murray T.J. (2011). Checklist of the Recent Mollusca Recorded from the New Zealand Exclusive Economic Zone.

Acteonidae
Gastropods of New Zealand
Gastropods described in 1906